The following lists events that happened during 2015 in Brunei.

Establishments
Tabuan Muda (English:Young Wasps) were established as a Bruneian football team.

Events
 January 8 - Brunei officially bans all future public celebrations of Christmas, in accordance with its conservative Islamic law Shariah.
Late June 2015 Southeast Asian haze began.

Sports
2015 SEABA Championship
Brunei at the 2015 World Aquatics Championships
Brunei at the 2015 Southeast Asian Games
Brunei at the 2015 World Championships in Athletics

References

 
2010s in Brunei
Years of the 21st century in Brunei
Brunei
Brunei